Ansouis is a commune in the Vaucluse department in the Provence-Alpes-Côte d'Azur region in southeastern France.

Geography
Ansouis is located between the Luberon massif and the Durance river.

History
A fortress was first built in the city in the 10th century, and has since been modified three times: once in the 13th century and again in the 15th and 19th centuries.

Ansouis is classified as one of The Most Beautiful Villages in France.

Demographics
The population, after peaking at 1,029 people in 1841, declined to only 463 people in 1931. It has since rebounded to 1,105 in 2006.

See also
 Elzéar and Delphine of Sabran
 Côtes du Luberon AOC
 Communes of the Vaucluse department

References

Communes of Vaucluse
Plus Beaux Villages de France